Remiornis heberti is an extinct species of paleognath bird from the Paleocene of France. It is a species comparable in size to modern rheas, and possibly related to another European Paleogene ratite, Palaeotis. In spite of being one of the oldest ratites in the world, it is often ignored for Gondwana vicariance narratives.

References

Paleocene birds
Paleognathae
Prehistoric birds of Europe
Fossil taxa described in 1881
Prehistoric bird genera